Samuel Llorca Ripoll (born 26 April 1985), known simply as Samuel, is a Spanish professional footballer who plays for Hércules CF as a central defender.

Club career
Born in Alicante, Valencian Community, Samuel started his senior career at local Hércules CF, with its reserves. In 2005 he moved to amateur neighbours CD Alone de Guardamar, being an important unit as they eventually retained their fourth division status.

Samuel stayed in the region for the following season, as he signed with Elche CF Ilicitano also in that level. On 9 June 2007, courtesy of manager David Vidal, he made his debut with the first team, starting in a 1–0 home win against CD Castellón; he consolidated his position in the 2007–08 season with the club also in division two, and received abroad offers from England's Sheffield United and Fulham, which eventually died down.

In July 2011, Samuel joined former side Hércules on a four-year contract. He scored a career-best five goals in his only season, as his team narrowly missed on top flight promotion in the play-offs.

Samuel moved to La Liga in the summer of 2012, agreeing to a four-year deal at RC Celta de Vigo. He only appeared once in the competition, after coming on as a second-half substitute for Mario Bermejo – following Gustavo Cabral's second yellow card and subsequent dismissal – in the Galician derby against Deportivo de La Coruña (1–1 home draw); on 30 June 2015, after dealing with a serious anterior cruciate ligament injury to his left knee and also having served second division loans at Deportivo Alavés and Real Valladolid, he left Balaídos.

References

External links

1985 births
Living people
Footballers from Alicante
Spanish footballers
Association football defenders
La Liga players
Segunda División players
Segunda División B players
Tercera División players
Hércules CF B players
Elche CF Ilicitano footballers
Elche CF players
Hércules CF players
RC Celta de Vigo players
Deportivo Alavés players
Real Valladolid players
Racing de Santander players